Joe Tallari (born October 5, 1980) is a Canadian professional ice hockey player.

Playing career 
Tallari was born in Thunder Bay, Ontario. In 2001, Tallari began his career playing for Niagara University where he was team's senior captain. Tallari moved to the Hartford Wolf Pack, the farm team for the New York Rangers. He stayed for just one season before moving to the Johnstown Chiefs of the ECHL, where he topped the 50 point margin.

Over the following three seasons, Tallari switched between teams in the ECHL and the AHL, with stints at the Cleveland Barons, the Bridgeport Sound Tigers (on two occasions) and the Las Vegas Wranglers.  He then moved to Europe, signing with the Manchester Phoenix in the summer of 2007 to play under Tony Hand.  Tallari had an outstanding season in Manchester, finishing as the EIHL's second highest goal scorer, managing 55 goals and 38 assists in 59 games.  This performance won Tallari the 'Best Newcomer' award at the 2008 Man of Ice Awards and ensured his selection for the 2007-08 EIHL All-Star team.

In April 2008 it was announced that Tallari would leave Manchester to sign for the Hockey Club Pustertal-Val Pusteria to try to qualify for the Italian national team. On 7 May 2009 he left Hockey Club Pustertal-Val Pusteria and signed a contract with HC Eppan Pirats Internorm. Tallari led the league with 36 goals during the regular season, and led Eppan-Appiano to the Serie B Championship.

Tallari came out of retirement during the 2010-11 ECHL season and played one game with the Wheeling Nailers. He was released on February 19, 2011

Awards and honours

References

External links
 
'2007/08 Man Of Ice Awards', Official Man Of Ice Website.
Arrivederci Joe, Tallari Lands Italian Dream   EIHL Official Website, 11/04/08.

1980 births
Bridgeport Sound Tigers players
Canadian ice hockey forwards
Hartford Wolf Pack players
HC Pustertal Wölfe players
Ice hockey people from Ontario
Johnstown Chiefs players
Las Vegas Wranglers players
Living people
Manchester Phoenix players
Niagara Purple Eagles men's ice hockey players
Sportspeople from Thunder Bay
Wheeling Nailers players
Canadian expatriate ice hockey players in England
Canadian expatriate ice hockey players in Italy
Canadian expatriate ice hockey players in the United States